Pietro de Torres (1634–1709) was a Roman Catholic prelate who served as Archbishop of Trani (1695–1709), Archbishop (Personal Title) of Potenza (1689–1695), and Archbishop of Dubrovnik (1665–1689).

Biography
Pietro de Torres was born in Trani, Italy and ordained a priest on 1 August 1660. On 12 January 1665, he was appointed during the papacy of Pope Alexander VII as Archbishop of Dubrovnik. On 24 January 1689, he was appointed during the papacy of Pope Innocent XI as Archbishop (Personal Title) of Potenza. On 24 March 1694, he was selected as Archbishop of Trani and confirmed by Pope Innocent XII on 24 January 1695. He served as Archbishop of Trani until his death in October 1709.

Episcopal succession
While bishop, Torres was the principal co-consecrator of:

References

External links and additional sources
 (for Chronology of Bishops) 
 (for Chronology of Bishops) 
 (for Chronology of Bishops) 
 (for Chronology of Bishops)  
 (for Chronology of Bishops) 
 (for Chronology of Bishops)  

17th-century Roman Catholic archbishops in the Republic of Venice
18th-century Roman Catholic archbishops in the Kingdom of Naples
Bishops appointed by Pope Alexander VII
Bishops appointed by Pope Innocent XI
Bishops appointed by Pope Innocent XII
1634 births
1709 deaths
Archbishops of Trani
17th-century Italian Roman Catholic bishops